Sisahaniya may refer to:
Sisahaniya, Bara District, Nepal
Sisahaniya, Dang District, Nepal